"I Knew You When" is a song written and composed by Joe South. It became a popular hit in 1965 when recorded by American pop and country singer Billy Joe Royal. There have also been several other hit cover versions of this song, including by Donny Osmond and Linda Ronstadt.

Billy Joe Royal version
"I Knew You When" was first recorded by Billy Joe Royal for his 1965 studio album, Down in the Boondocks. The song reached No. 14 on the Billboard Hot 100 the week of November 6, 1965. The song went to No. 1 on the Canadian music chart in November 1965.

Donny Osmond version
Donny Osmond released a version in 1971 as the B-side of "Hey Girl" that went to No. 9 on the Hot 100 as a double-sided hit.

Linda Ronstadt version
Linda Ronstadt recorded a cover version for her Gold-plus 1982 album, Get Closer.  Her single was produced by Peter Asher and released on Asylum Records. Aided by a popular music video, it reached #30 on the Cash Box Top 100 chart and #37 on the Billboard Hot 100 as the album's second single.

Additionally, it reached No. 84 on the country chart, and No. 90 in the United Kingdom. The song was also a Top 40 Hit in Australia, giving Ronstadt an underappreciated hit, reaching #36 on the Kent Music Report chart in early 1983.  It did best on the adult contemporary charts, reaching #29 (U.S.) and #17 (Canada).

Other versions
Wade Flemons released a version of the song as a single in 1964 on Vee-Jay Records.  Flemons would become a founding member of Earth, Wind & Fire in 1971.
Joe South would later record his version of the song for his 1969 album, Games People Play.

References

1964 songs
1964 singles
1965 singles
1972 singles
1982 singles
Billy Joe Royal songs
Donny Osmond songs
Linda Ronstadt songs
Songs written by Joe South
RPM Top Singles number-one singles
Columbia Records singles
Asylum Records singles
Songs about loneliness